Bhadiyapur is a village in Fatehpur district, Uttar Pradesh, India. The Yamuna River is 5 km south.

References

Villages in Fatehpur district